Viktor Petrovich Sots (born 1958) is a retired Soviet heavyweight weightlifter. In 1981–1982 he won the world and European titles and set six ratified world records: five in the clean and jerk, and one in the snatch. “The Sot Press” was named after Russian weightlifter (1981 and 1982 World Weightlifting Championships Men's 100 kg), Viktor Sots. Viktor Sots’ “claim to fame” was being the first heavy lifter to exclusively use the power jerk instead of the split jerk in competition, often seen pressing from the front rack position in the squat. Throughout the years, the “Sots press” has been used to describe any pressing movement while in the squat (behind the neck, front rack, etc.), however the original variation was performed by Viktor in the front.

References

1958 births
Living people
Soviet male weightlifters
World Weightlifting Championships medalists
Place of birth missing (living people)